Aphodius (Pharaphodius) crenatus, is a species of dung beetle native to India, and Sri Lanka.

It is an edible type of beetle consumed in Thailand.

References 

Scarabaeidae
Insects of Sri Lanka
Insects of India
Insects described in 1862